John McGregor McIntyre (4 January 1895 – February 1974) was a Scottish professional footballer who played in the Football League for Fulham, The Wednesday, Blackburn Rovers and Blackpool as an inside forward. He also played in the Scottish League for Partick Thistle and St Mirren.

Personal life 
McIntyre served in the Royal Air Force during the First World War.

Career statistics

References

1895 births
1974 deaths
Footballers from Glasgow
Scottish footballers
Partick Thistle F.C. players
Fulham F.C. players
Sheffield Wednesday F.C. players
Blackburn Rovers F.C. players
Blackpool F.C. players
Chorley F.C. players
English Football League players
Association football inside forwards
Association football wing halves
Vale of Leven F.C. wartime guest players
St Mirren F.C. wartime guest players
Scottish Football League players
Royal Air Force personnel of World War I